Kirill Andreyevich Shamshurin (born 14 May 1990) is a Russian sprint canoeist. He participated at the 2018 ICF Canoe Sprint World Championships.

References

External links

1990 births
Russian male canoeists
Living people
ICF Canoe Sprint World Championships medalists in Canadian
People from Tiraspol
Canoeists at the 2019 European Games
European Games medalists in canoeing
European Games silver medalists for Russia
European Games bronze medalists for Russia